Santiago Mina Lorenzo (born 7 December 1995) is a Spanish professional footballer who plays as a forward for Saudi Professional League club Al Shabab on loan from RC Celta de Vigo.

He spent most of his career at Celta, totalling 163 games and 42 goals across two spells. He made 268 appearances and scored 63 goals in La Liga where he also represented Valencia, transferring there for €10 million and winning the Copa del Rey in 2019.

In 2022, Mina was sentenced to four years in prison for sexual abuse committed five years earlier.

Club career

Celta
Born in Vigo, Galicia, Mina played youth football with hometown's RC Celta de Vigo, and made his senior debut with the reserves in the 2012–13 season, in Tercera División. On 5 January he signed a professional deal with the club, running until 2018.

Mina made his first-team – and La Liga – debut for them on 16 February 2013, coming on as a substitute for Iago Aspas in the 66th minute of a 3–1 away defeat against Getafe CF. He scored his first top-flight goal on 16 September, but in a 3–2 loss at Athletic Bilbao; at only 17 years, 9 months and 10 days, he became the side's youngest goalscorer in the first division.

On 11 April 2015, Mina scored four goals in a 6–1 home rout of Rayo Vallecano, becoming the youngest player in the last 80 years to do so in the Spanish top tier and the first from Celta since 1979.

Valencia
On 4 July 2015, Mina moved to fellow league team Valencia CF after agreeing to a six-year deal for a €10 million fee. He scored his first competitive goal for them on 5 December, netting four minutes from time in a 1–1 home draw against FC Barcelona.

On 18 February 2016, in only the first 45 minutes, Mina scored twice and provided three assists in a UEFA Europa League last-32 tie against SK Rapid Wien, in an eventual 6–0 win also at the Mestalla Stadium (the half-time result was a competition record).

Mina scored a career-best 12 league goals in 2017–18 as Valencia came fourth, despite being more often than not a substitute for Simone Zaza and Rodrigo; halfway through the campaign, the trio had 12 more goals than Real Madrid's "BBC" attacking line. The following season, he netted braces in Copa del Rey victories over CD Ebro (round of 32) and Sporting de Gijón (last 16) as his club picked up their first honour for 11 years, being unused in the 2–1 final defeat of Barcelona on 25 May 2019.

Return to Celta
After four years at the Mestalla Stadium, Mina returned to Celta on a five-year contract as Maxi Gómez moved in the opposite direction. In 2020–21, he scored 12 goals in partnership with Aspas' 14; this included both goals of a 2–1 win at Barcelona on 16 May to end that team's title hopes.

In July 2022, Celta reached an agreement to loan Mina to Aris Thessaloniki F.C. of Super League Greece, but the player refused the deal, as he did with Shabab Al Ahli Club from the United Arab Emirates. On 23 August, he joined the Saudi Professional League's Al Shabab FC on a one-year loan for a fee of €2.5 million and salary of €1 million. He scored on his debut as a substitute three days later, concluding a 3–0 home win over Al Batin FC.

Personal life
Mina's father, also named Santiago, was also a footballer. A defender, he played for several clubs in the 1970s and 1980s, including Celta.

In December 2019, Mina was charged with sexual assault relating to an incident in Mojácar two years earlier. He and his alleged accomplice, former Celta teammate David Goldar, were tried in March 2022. On 4 May, Mina was sentenced to four years in prison for sexual abuse, being found not guilty of the more serious offence due to lack of violence; he was ordered to pay €50,000 in compensation.

The judge found it proven that the victim had returned to the footballers' caravan to spend the night with Goldar, when Mina entered undressed and blocked the exit. He then penetrated her mouth with his genitalia and her genitalia with his fingers, causing injuries. While the victim's account was consistent, Mina's testimony varied and was different to that of Goldar. After his conviction, he was banished from Celta by club president Carlos Mouriño, who then reintegrated him into training as a paid employee until the end of the appeals process.

Career statistics

Club

Honours
Valencia
Copa del Rey: 2018–19

References

External links

1995 births
Living people
Spanish footballers
Footballers from Vigo
Association football forwards
La Liga players
Segunda División B players
Tercera División players
Celta de Vigo B players
RC Celta de Vigo players
Valencia CF players
Saudi Professional League players
Al-Shabab FC (Riyadh) players
Spain youth international footballers
Spain under-21 international footballers
Spanish expatriate footballers
Expatriate footballers in Saudi Arabia
Spanish expatriate sportspeople in Saudi Arabia
People convicted of sex crimes
Sportspeople convicted of crimes
21st-century Spanish criminals